Le Grand Rex is a Parisian cinema and concert venue.

Location and access 
 
Its facades and roofs, as well as its hall and its decor have been listed as a Monument historique since a decree on October 5, 1981. This giant cinema has a capacity of more than 2700 people in its great hall and posts an average attendance levels of 1 million visitors per year.
 
Le Grand Rex is served by the Metro lines 8 and 9 at the Bonne-Nouvelle station, as well as by the bus lines 20, 32 and 39.

History 
In the early 1930s, Jacques Haïk, a wealthy movie producer and distributor and the owner of the Olympia, gets the idea of building a very extravagant cinema: it could have a capacity of more than 5000 spectators on a surface area of  m², with a ceiling peaking at more than 30 meters, representing a luminous starry vault.
 
Its designers are the architect Auguste Bluysen and the engineer John Eberson. The façade is designed by the sculptor Henri-Édouard Navarre and the decoration of the great hall by Maurice Dufrène.
 
The Grand Rex is a scale model of the famous Radio City Music Hall in New York City.
 
The cinema is also known for its interior decor. Specialized in "atmospheric halls", its architects built more than 400 decors of phantasmatic cities under cloudy, clear or starry skies in the United States.
 
Here, the great hall has been decorated by an "ancient Mediterranean" city in relief, located in the open air with its colorful walls reproducing the Art deco atmosphere of the "French Riviera" villas.
 

The Grand Rex hall opens its doors on the evening of December 8, 1932, in the presence of the cinema's pioneer, Louis Lumière and  guests. The Three Musketeers by Henri Diamant-Berger is on the bill.

It is one the biggest halls in Paris.

The projection booth is located in the corbel of the rue Poissonnière. The angle lantern is actually a simple metal trellis on which was projected cement mortar.
 
The producer and director Émile Couzinet opens a small Rex in Bordeaux (800 seats), designed by the same architects, which stays open until the 1970s.

Despite the success of the Grand Rex, Jacques Haïk files for bankruptcy and sells it to Gaumont, before Jean Hellmann, Alan Byre and Laudy Lawrence buy it themselves.

From the 1940s to the 1980s 
During the Occupation, the Grand Rex is requisitioned by the German army, which turns it into « Soldatenkino », saving it for its troops of soldiers on leave. In September 1942 it is the target of a bombing by the Détachement Valmy. The cinema reopens on October 13, 1944, after the Liberation of Paris. It shows an American film, while chewing-gums are available during the intermission. From April 12 to June 22, 1945, it temporarily closes, turned into a welcome center for the repatriate war prisoners. In 1946, Pinocchio is the first Disney feature film to be shown there.

At that time, the program of Grand Rex is divided in two parts, with an intermission in between: a first one with a musical opening and the news, a second one with attractions (waterfalls, erupting volcanos…) and then the proper film. Dancers, musicians, machinery and ushers are therefore necessary for the smooth running of the show.

Starting on December 4, 1953, the first feature film in CinemaScope, The Robe, directed by Henry Koster, is projected there in tandem with the  cinema located on the Champs-Elysées. In 1950 already, during the screening of Gone with the Wind, the projectionist had enlarged the image during fire scenes.

After the failure of the "Le Miroir de Neptune" (The Neptune Mirror) attraction in 1953 (swimmers performing in a transparent pool placed on the stage), the "Féerie des eaux" (Magic waters) attraction is created in March 1954, during which  liters are projected twenty meters high with lighting effects and a musical accompaniment. It is a success: water shows have enlivened the great hall every year at Christmas since 1954, the "Féerie des eaux" (Magic waters), shortly before the screening of the end of the year Disney film.
 
In 1957, the escalator of the Grand Rex is inaugurated by Gary Cooper and Mylène Demongeot, superseding elevators. It is the first time a European hall is equipped with such material.

In 1960, the cinema experiences a better attendance level than the Louvre Museum. Eight years later, the combination of the "Féerie des eaux" (Magic waters) and of The Jungle Book enables the Grand Rex to receive around 500 000 spectators.

In 1963, Alfred Hitchcock presents its new movie, The Birds there.

In 1974, three small halls are added to the complex, at the location of the dressing and rehearsal rooms. The Rex Club, a disco club, replaces the "Rêve" dancing, a chic establishment which was created in 1932.

Since the 1980s 
In 1984, the Grand Rex includes seven halls, then eight in 1990, but without having needed to divide the great hall, going against a trend noticeable in other cinemas. The Grand Rex and its Art deco facade are listed in the inventory of the Monument Historique in 1981.

In 1988 "Le Grand Large" (The Great Large) is installed, a 300 square meters screen, making it the biggest in Europe (excluding IMAX). Designed and created by Luc Heripret, it is inaugurated by Luc Besson’s The Big Blue, which totals  tickets sold at the Grand Rex after months on the bill.

In 1997, the Grand Rex opens its program to festivals, concerts and solo performances of many artists who perform on stage.

In 1988, the director Peter Jackson receives an award for his film Bad Taste there, and, in 2002, the singer Britney Spears was present for the screening of Crossroads  causing a riot during which some outside windows were shattered.

In 2009, the facade was equipped with digital signs, whose light showcases its Art deco column.

In 2017, the great hall was renovated.

While its contemporary attendance levels are usually close to a million spectators, the COVID-19 pandemic forced the Grand Rex to close in August 2020, after attempting at the end of the first lockdown in June, to screen retrospectives and thematic marathons. Starting from December of the same year, the cinema is being fully renovated.

It is renowned for hosting premieres with the films’ crews as well as special events, called “Marathons”, which gathers the fans of a franchise (Star Wars, Marvel Cinematic Universe, the adaptations of Tolkien’s work or else The Hunger Games for example).

Technical specifications sheet 
 Owner: Marianne Hellmann
 Operator: SAS Le Grand Rex Paris

The Great Hall 
  seats,
 Large and comfortable leather chairs for the orchestra,
 A mezzanine equipped with the same chairs as the orchestra,
 A 2nd balcony with  seats,
 A luminous arch,
 A large adjustable stage (shows and concerts),
 A stage screen which is 16.9 meters large and 7 meters high, located on the stage (under the luminous arch),
 Three DP 32 4K projectors,
 A screen named “Le Grand Large” (The Great Large), which is 24.9 meters large and 11.35 meters high (about 280 m²). It is uncoiled and coiled in front of the luminous arch.

Le Grand Large (The Great Large) 

This screen, one of the biggest in France and which takes up the entire available width of the hall, is hidden in the cinema’s ceiling and only comes out for screenings. While it is uncoiled in the dark, the spectators can discover an original presentation in 2D or 3D.

The audience is only seated on the 2nd balcony and ends up particularly close to the screen.

Projection: 2 Barco DP32 projectors in 4k.

The Rex’s other halls 
Since 2017, the Grand Rex has renovated its halls every year. We can find:
 Hall 2: 500 seats
 Hall 3: 238 seats called the “Gotham” hall
 Hall 5: 163 seats called the “Matrix” hall
 Hall 4: 122 seats
 Hall 7: 109 seats called the “Tron” hall
 Hall 6: 78 seats called the “Love” hall

Rex Studios 

A 50-minute course is available behind the big screen, backstage and in the technical spaces of the cinema. Initiated by Francois Confino and Philippe Hellmann, it is designed and created by Luc Heripret, in collaboration with the set designer Pascal Mazoyer. The course presents the history of the Grand Rex before diving into the world of the cinema's occupations and special effects in an interactive and playful way: pedestrian and filmed course. The visitor gradually becomes the extra of a shooting before being projected in a film extract, whose recording they will be able to buy.

Escape Game 

In 2021, the Grand Rex offers its clients a new attraction which immerses the spectators in riddles to help save the greatest cinema classics. This escape game which progresses through different rooms representing the main themes of the 7th art forces the clients to focus to collect a maximum of points.

It is designed and created by Luc Heripret and Team Break within the Rex Studios.

La Féerie des eaux (Magic waters) 
Each year, the Christmas Disney cartoon is traditionally screened in the Grand Rex great hall (screen under the arc).

The screening starts two weeks before the French national release.

As the opening act, the audience can attend a sound, light and water show called the Féerie des eaux (Magic waters). A huge pool and  colored water jets are placed on the stage for this.

References

Bibliography

See also 
 Category:Le Grand Rex

External links 
 Official website
 The Grand Rex history

Cinemas in Paris
Art Deco architecture
Theatres in Paris
Music venues in Paris
Buildings and structures in the 2nd arrondissement of Paris
Art Deco architecture in France
Atmospheric theatres
John Eberson buildings
Theatres completed in 1932
Movie palaces